In geometry, a spherical sector, also known as a spherical cone, is a portion of a sphere or of a ball defined by a conical boundary with apex at the center of the sphere. It can be described as the union of a spherical cap and the cone formed by the center of the sphere and the base of the cap. It is the three-dimensional analogue of the sector of a circle.

Volume

If the radius of the sphere is denoted by r and the height of the cap by h, the volume of the spherical sector is

This may also be written as

where φ is half the cone angle, i.e., φ is the angle between the rim of the cap and the direction to the middle of the cap as seen from the sphere center.

The volume V of the sector is related to the area A of the cap by:

Area

The curved surface area of the spherical sector (on the surface of the sphere, excluding the cone surface) is

It is also 

where Ω is the solid angle of the spherical sector in steradians, the SI unit of solid angle. One steradian is defined as the solid angle subtended by a cap area of A = r2.

Derivation 

The volume can be calculated by integrating the differential volume element

over the volume of the spherical sector,

where the integrals have been separated, because the integrand can be separated into a product of functions each with one dummy variable.

The area can be similarly calculated by integrating the differential spherical area element 

over the spherical sector, giving

where φ is inclination (or elevation) and θ is azimuth (right). Notice r is a constant. Again, the integrals can be separated.

See also 
 Circular sector — the analogous 2D figure.
 Spherical cap
 Spherical segment
 Spherical wedge

References

Spherical geometry